Nomamyrmex is a genus of army ants in the subfamily Dorylinae. Its two species are distributed in the Neotropics: Nomamyrmex esenbeckii is known from southern United States to northern Argentina, and Nomamyrmex hartigii is known from Mexico to southern Brazil. Nomamyrmex esenbeckii is the only known predator of mature colonies of Atta leaf-cutter ants.

Species
Nomamyrmex esenbeckii (Westwood, 1842)
Nomamyrmex hartigii (Westwood, 1842)

References

External links

Dorylinae
Ant genera
Hymenoptera of North America
Hymenoptera of South America